The 1997 Grand Prix de Suisse was the 82nd edition of the Züri-Metzgete road cycling one day race. It was held on 24 August 1997 as part of the 1997 UCI Road World Cup. The race took place between the cities of Basel and Zurich was won by Davide Rebellin of Italy.

Result

References 

Züri-Metzgete
Züri-Metzgete
Züri-Metzgete